St. George Antiochian Orthodox Church is a brick Antiochian Orthodox church in the Villeray neighbourhood of Montreal, Quebec, Canada. Designed by architect Joseph-Raoul Gariépy, the church was constructed in 1939–40 to serve the Syrian Orthodox community in Montreal. It was designated a National Historic Site of Canada in 1999 as an important symbol of the history and traditions of this community in Canada.

References

External links

St. George Antiochian Orthodox Church

George Antiochian Orthodox Church Montreal
National Historic Sites in Quebec
George Antiochian Orthodox
Syrian Canadian
Villeray–Saint-Michel–Parc-Extension
George Antiochian Orthodox
20th-century Eastern Orthodox church buildings
Eastern Orthodox church buildings in Canada
Churches completed in 1940
20th-century churches in Canada